Patrick Joseph Morrissey (6 October 1891 – 25 January 1938) was an Australian pastoralist and Australian rules footballer who played with University.

The son of Victorian politician, schoolteacher, storekeeper and pastoralist John Morrissey, Morrissey was born in Merrigum, Victoria but moved with his family to New South Wales. He operated pastoral properties in Singleton, Muswellbrook, Blandford and Willow Tree, New South Wales.

Sources

External links

1891 births
1938 deaths
Australian rules footballers from Victoria (Australia)
University Football Club players
People educated at Xavier College